Adéla Škrdlová (born February 16, 2001) is a Czech ice hockey player for SK Horácká Slavia Třebíč and the Czech national team.

She participated at the 2017 IIHF Women's World Championship.

References

External links

2001 births
Living people
Czech women's ice hockey defencemen
Ice hockey players at the 2016 Winter Youth Olympics
Czech expatriate ice hockey players in the United States